Stroud Mansion is a historic home located at Stroudsburg, Monroe County, Pennsylvania.  It was built about 1795, and is a -story building with pedimented gable roof and a -story rear wing.  The main section measures 50 feet by 40 feet, with the rear wing measuring 28 feet by 24 feet, 4 inches.  It was built by Stroudsburg's founder Jacob Stroud for his son John. It remained in the Stroud family until 1893, although leased for use as a store and as a boarding house. It now houses the Monroe County Historical Association.

It was added to the National Register of Historic Places in 1979.

References

External links
Monroe County Historical Society website

History museums in Pennsylvania
Houses on the National Register of Historic Places in Pennsylvania
Houses completed in 1795
Houses in Monroe County, Pennsylvania
Museums in Monroe County, Pennsylvania
National Register of Historic Places in Monroe County, Pennsylvania